is a Japanese footballer currently studying at the Niigata University of Health and Welfare.

Career statistics

Club
.

Notes

References

External links

2002 births
Living people
Sportspeople from Osaka Prefecture
Association football people from Osaka Prefecture
Niigata University of Health and Welfare alumni
Japanese footballers
Association football goalkeepers
J3 League players
Gamba Osaka players
Gamba Osaka U-23 players